The 8th Alabama Infantry Regiment was an infantry regiment that served in the Confederate Army during the American Civil War.

Service

The 8th Alabama Infantry Regiment was mustered in at Richmond, Virginia, on June 10, 1861.

The regiment surrendered  at Appomattox Court House.

Total strength and casualties
The 8th mustered 1377 men during its existence.  It suffered approximately 300 killed in action or mortally wounded and 170 men who died of disease, for a total of approximately 470 fatalities.  An additional 236 men were discharged or transferred from the regiment.

Commanders
 Colonel John Anthony Winston
 Colonel Young Lea Royston
 Colonel Hilary Abner Herbert

See also
Alabama Civil War Confederate Units
Alabama in the American Civil War

References

Units and formations of the Confederate States Army from Alabama
1861 establishments in Alabama
Military units and formations established in 1861
Military units and formations established in 1961